Southern Star may refer to:

Arts and entertainment 
The Vanished Diamond, also translated as The Southern Star (French: L'Étoile du sud), an 1884 novel by Jules Verne and Paschal Grousset
The Southern Star, a 1969 comedy crime film directed by Sidney Hayers, based on the Jules Verne novel
Southern Star (album), a 1989 album by Alabama
"Southern Star" (song), a song for the album

Companies

Australia
Southern Star Group (formerly Southern Star Productions), a television producer and distributor
Endemol Southern Star, a joint venture between Southern Star Group and Endemol

New Zealand
Southern Star (radio)

South Sudan
Southern Star Airlines

United States
Southern Star Amusement
Southern Star Central Gas Pipeline
Southern Star Concrete
Southern Star Brewing Company

Newspapers 
The Southern Star (Alabama), United States
The Southern Star (Brisbane), Australia
The Southern Star (County Cork), Ireland
The Southern Star (Montevideo), Uruguay
The Southern Star (Bega, New South Wales), Australia

Places and structures 
Southern Star, renamed Melbourne Star in 2013, a giant Ferris wheel in Melbourne, Australia
Midlothian, Texas, an American city also known as "DFW's Southern Star"
Southern Star, a pirate ship ride at Carowinds that goes upside-down twice
Southern Star Abbey, a Cistercian abbey in New Zealand
Southern Star Amphitheater at AstroWorld in Houston, Texas

Other uses 
Southern Star, a racehorse that finished last in the 2003 Grand National and was a non-finisher in the 2004 Grand National
, a heavy lift ship launched in 1945 and renamed MV Southern Star in 1964

See also 

 Star of the South, a diamond gemstone
 South Star, the south polar star(s)
 Southstar, U.S. rapper
 Southstar, German DJ
 
 
 Southern Stars (disambiguation)
 Southern (disambiguation)
 Star (disambiguation)